Podhajsky is a surname. Notable people with the surname include:

Alois Podhajsky (1898–1973), Austrian equestrian
Leif Podhajsky, Australian graphic designer and art director